There are over 9,000 Grade I listed buildings in England.  This page is a list of these buildings in the county of Hertfordshire, organised by district.

Broxbourne

|}

Dacorum

|}

East Hertfordshire

|}

Hertsmere

|}

North Hertfordshire

|}

St Albans

|}

Stevenage

|}

Three Rivers

|}

Watford

|}

Welwyn Hatfield

|}

Notes

References 

National Heritage List for England

External links

 
Hertfordshire
Lists of listed buildings in Hertfordshire